NCUK - The University Consortium is an organisation in the international higher education sector which specialises in offering university pathway qualifications, support, and services for international students through its global network of Study Centres. It was established in 2003 by the Northern Consortium; an education charity founded in 1987 by a group of leading UK universities.

The Northern Consortium: Founder Universities
The Northern Consortium charity was founded by the following universities who still constitute to NCUK's consortium of universities:

The University of Bradford
The University of Huddersfield (then as Huddersfield Polytechnic)
Leeds Beckett University (then as Leeds Polytechnic)
The University of Leeds
Liverpool John Moores University (then as Liverpool Polytechnic)
Manchester Metropolitan University (then as Manchester Polytechnic)
The University of Manchester
The University of Salford
Sheffield Hallam University (then as Sheffield Polytechnic)
The University of Sheffield

NCUK Associate Universities:

 Aston University
 The University of Birmingham
 University of Bristol
 Queen Mary University of London
 University of Kent
Kingston University London

In addition to these universities, NCUK’s qualifications are also now recognised by other universities in the UK, Australia, New Zealand, Canada, the USA, and many more.

Note: NCUK’s original membership of 12 institutions was reduced to 11 by the merger in 2004 of UMIST and the Victoria University of Manchester and then to 10 in 2016 following the University of Liverpool's departure from the charity group.

Malaysia project

The Northern Consortium was initially established by the international offices of 12 universities in 1987 who collaborated to design and deliver a split degree programme for Malaysian government-sponsored students. Programmes were developed which aided the Malaysian economy – engineering, computing, pharmacy and business – and delivered as ‘transfer’ programmes. Students studied a first year in Malaysia before transferring to one of NCUK’s founding universities, or to another UK institution.

Over 6,000 students progressed through the programmes and into UK institutions over the 10 years of the project, saving the Malaysian government significant costs in their sponsorship budget.

NCUK today
NCUK - The University Consortium continues to provide opportunities for international students. Each year, NCUK's university pathway qualifications enable thousands of international students to start their journey to university through its global network of 100+ Study Centres in 30+ countries. NCUK qualifications are developed with its founder universities to ensure they are of the highest standard and fully prepare international students for university study. NCUK has helped more than 40,000 students progress to an international university through its university pathway qualifications. 

NCUK's head office is based in Manchester in the UK.

Notes

External links
NCUK

College and university associations and consortia in the United Kingdom
Education in Manchester
Educational charities based in the United Kingdom
1987 establishments in the United Kingdom
Organisations based in Manchester
Organizations established in 1987
Universities and colleges in the United Kingdom